Mucilaginibacter aquaedulcis is a Gram-negative, aerobic and rod-shaped bacterium from the genus of Mucilaginibacter which has been isolated from fresh water in Yeongju in Korea.

References

Sphingobacteriia
Bacteria described in 2015